The 2006–07 Serie A season was the 73rd season of the Serie A, the top level of ice hockey in Italy. Nine teams participated in the league, and SG Cortina won the championship by defeating the HCJ Vipers Milano in the final.

First phase

First round

Second round

Second phase

Group A

Group B

Playoffs

Quarterfinals

Semifinals

Final

External links 
 Season on hockeyarchives.info  

Serie A (ice hockey) seasons
Italy
2006–07 in Italian ice hockey